Sarasinula is a genus of air-breathing land slugs in the family Veronicellidae, the leatherleaf slugs.

Species
Species in the genus Sarasinula include:

 Sarasinula dubia (Semper, 1885)
 Sarasinula linguaeformis (Semper, 1885)
 Sarasinula marginata (Semper, 1885)
 Sarasinula plebeia (P. Fischer, 1868) – Caribbean leatherleaf

References 

Veronicellidae
Taxa named by Georg Grimpe